Feel the Real is the eighth studio album by American R&B singer-songwriter Musiq Soulchild. It was released on September 15, 2017, by eOne Music. It features the singles "Simple Things" and "Start Over" the latter of which reached number 11 on the Billboard Adult R&B Songs chart. In November 2017, the album was nominated for Best R&B Album at the 2018 60th Annual Grammy Awards.

Track listing 
Credits adapted from liner notes.

Personnel
Credits adapted from liner notes.
Marsha Ambrosius – arrangement, composition, vocal production
Blaqgxld – vocals
BLAQSMURPH – instrumentation, production, programming
Christopher Bradley – composition, instrumentation, production, programming
Gwen Bunn – synthesizer
Dan Cohen – engineering
Payge Cooper – drums
Phil Cornish – keyboards, production
Cyrus Deshield – composition
Blake Eiseman – mixing
Gmjr – instrumentation, production, programming
Terence Harper – trumpet
Rod Harris – guitar
Rod Harris, Jr. – guitar
Frank Houston – saxophone
The Husel – composition, vocals
Willie Hyn – composition, vocals
J'rell – composition, engineering, instrumentation, production, programming
Donovan Jarvis – keyboards
Jimmy Jones – trombone
Colin Leonard – mastering
Alexander Lloyd – composition
Lo Key – composition
David Luke – production, synthesizer
Sean Mack – artwork
Julian McGuire – guitar
Musiq Soulchild – arrangement, composition, cover art concept, executive production, instrumentation, production, programming, vocals, vocal arrangement, vocal production
Alexander Plummer – instrumentation, production, programming
Doobie Powell – instrumentation, production, programming
Campbellson Shackleton – composition
Leo Sibilly – engineering
June Summers – composition
Chris Theory – vocal arrangement
Jonathan Troy – bass, instrumentation, production, programming
Neil deGrasse Tyson – composition
Max Unruh – engineering assistance
Elijah Y. Whittingham – instrumentation, production, programming
Geremy Wimbush – drums

Charts

References

2017 albums
Musiq Soulchild albums
E1 Music albums